Chesapeake Baptist College & Seminary is an independent Baptist school located in Severn, Maryland, United States.  The school is devoted primarily to training pastors, missionaries, evangelists, and Christian school teachers.

History 
Chesapeake Baptist College was founded in 1991 by Dr. Barney Lyon, former pastor of Chesapeake Baptist Church. The college states that "The school is a distinctively Christian institution that is characterized by its goal of academic excellence and its desire to build Biblical character, moral virtue, and a lifelong pursuit of knowledge in its students."  The school is associated with the Christian fundamentalist movement, though it does not include itself as a member of any group or organization.  It takes a historical Baptist position on most issues and bases it doctrine and practice on the Scriptures.

Change in Leadership 
In January 2016, Matthew Lyon was chosen as the new pastor of Chesapeake Baptist Church, and the head of the college.  With new leadership came new changes. and though committed to education, Matthew Lyon chose to scale back the college.  As a result, the school will no longer offer four-year degrees, and will instead focus on less formal mentorship and ministerial training.

Academics 
Though small in size, Chesapeake Baptist College has placed very high stress on its level of instruction. The founder, Dr. Lyon, has an earned doctorate from Westminster Theological Seminary, Philadelphia; the new president, Matthew Lyon is working on a PhD from Southern Baptist Theological Seminary; all of the instructors in the school are required to have their master's degree before teaching.

Accreditation 
Chesapeake Baptist College is not accredited by the State of Maryland or any other accrediting organization. They are, however, recognized by the Maryland Higher Education Commission, and are permitted to grant religious degrees.

External links 
 Chesapeake Baptist Church

Independent Baptist universities and colleges in the United States
Baptist Christianity in Maryland
Seminaries and theological colleges in Maryland
Universities and colleges in Anne Arundel County, Maryland
Severn, Maryland